The Chiusella valley (in Italian Valle Chiusella or, simply, Valchiusella) is a valley in the Province of Turin (Piedmont, Italy).

Etymology
Valchiusella takes its name from Chiusella, a right-hand tributary of the Dora Baltea which flows through the valley.

Geography
The valley starts in the Graian Alps from the rough mountains where it meets with Aosta and Soana valleys and initially encompasses an almost unpopulated area used as pasturage during the summer.  After Traversella the valley widens and becomes a hilly area punctuated with several small towns and villages.

Municipalities of the valley 
The Val Chiusella is divided among the municipalities of:
 Brosso,
 Issiglio,  
 Rueglio, 
 Traversella,
 Val di Chy,
Valchiusa
 Vidracco,
 Vistrorio

Notable summits
Among the summits which surround the valley (all belonging to the Graian Alps) there are:
   Monfandì - 2.819 m
   Monte Giavino - 2.766 m
   Monte Marzo - 2.756 m
   Punta Liamau - 2.734 m
   Punta Mariasco - 2.412 m
   Monte Gregorio - 1955 m
   Cima Bossola - 1.510 m

See also
 Chiusella, the river that flows through the valley
 Federation of Damanhur, an ecovillage and spiritual community situated about 50 kilometres (31 mi) north of the city of Turin
 Gran Paradiso National Park, contiguous with the French Vanoise national park, located in the foothills of the Alps

References

External links

 http://www.c-m-valchiusella-v-sacra-dora-baltea-c.it/ 

Valleys of Piedmont
Valleys of the Alps
Metropolitan City of Turin